Mejaouda is a settlement which lies in the Sahara Desert of eastern Mauritania. It is approximately sixty kilometers from the border with Mali.

References

Populated places in Mauritania